A Sold Life is a 1976 Italian war-drama film written and directed by Aldo Florio and starring Enrico Maria Salerno and Gerardo Amato. It is loosely based on the novella L'antimonio by Leonardo Sciascia. For his performance in this film Gerardo Amato won the Grolla d'oro for best new actor.

Plot

Cast 

 Enrico Maria Salerno as Luigi Ventura
 Gerardo Amato as Michele Rizzuto
  Germano Longo as Major Limentani
  Sergio Gibello as  Pellicioni 
  Gianfranco Bullo as  Coviello
  Rodolfo Bianchi as Lt. Bonelli
  Gabriele Tozzi as Major Milani
  Marino Cenna as Uras 
  Toni De Leo as  Vitta 
 Marino Masé as  Professor Marcelli
  Daniele Dublino as  Federale
  Imma Piro as  Miguel Atienza's Sister
 Angela Goodwin as  Miguel Atienza's Mother
 Francesco Pau as Miguel Atinenza
 Andrea Aureli as  Francoist Official
 Rik Battaglia

See also 
 
 List of Italian films of 1976

References

External links

Italian war drama films
1970s war drama films
Films scored by Ennio Morricone
Spanish Civil War films
Films based on works by Leonardo Sciascia
1976 drama films
1976 films
1970s Italian-language films
1970s Italian films